Parted Curtains is a 1920 American silent crime-drama film written and directed by Bertram Bracken and James C. Bradford. The film stars Henry B. Walthall, Mary Alden, William Clifford, Edward Cecil, Margaret Landis, and Mickey Moore. The film was released on April 2, 1920.

Cast   
Henry B. Walthall as Joe Jenkins 
Mary Alden as Mrs. Masters
William Clifford as The Weasel
Edward Cecil as Wheeler Masters
Margaret Landis as Helen
Mickey Moore as Bobby Masters 
Ann Davis		
Charles Wheelock 		
Richard Morris

References

External links

1920 films
American crime drama films
1920 crime drama films
American silent feature films
American black-and-white films
Films directed by Bertram Bracken
1920s English-language films
1920s American films